The North Carolina General Assembly of October 1784 met in New Bern from October 25, 1784 to November 26, 1784. The assembly consisted of the 116 members of the North Carolina House of Commons and 55 senators of North Carolina Senate elected by the voters on August 20, 1784.  As prescribed by the 1776 Constitution of North Carolina the General Assembly elected Richard Caswell as Governor of North Carolina and members of the Council of State.

Councilors of State

As prescribed by the 1776 Constitution of North Carolina, the General Assembly elected the governor and the following members of the North Carolina Council of State:
 Joseph Leech, Craven County (President)
 James Kenan, Duplin County (President pro tempore)
 Winston Caswell, Dobbs County (Clerk)
 James Armstrong, Pitt County
 John Hawks, Craven County
 Robert Burton, Granville County
 Thomas Eaton, Warren County
 Abraham Sheppard, Dobbs County

James Glasgow continued as North Carolina Secretary of State (served 17771798).  The assembly elected Memucan Hunt (served 17841787) as first statewide North Carolina State Treasurer.  Alfred Moore continued (served 17821791) as North Carolina Attorney General.

Assembly membership
There were 55 counties in North Carolina in 1784.  Each county was authorized to elect two representatives to the House of Commons and one delegate to the Senate.  In addition, the six districts were authorized one delegate each.  (Sullivan, Washington, Davidson, and Green counties would later become part of Tennessee in 1796.) Richard Caswell was elected Governor of North Carolina by this General Assembly but did not take the governor's office until 1785.  According to a book by the Secretary of State edited by Cheney and published in 1974, this assembly had a second session that concluded in June 1784.

House of Commons members

The House of Commons delegates elected a Speaker (William Blount), Clerk (John Hunt), Assistant Clerk (John Haywood), Doorkeeper, and Assistant Doorkeeper.  The following delegates to the House of Commons were elected by the voters of North Carolina to represent each county and district:

Senate members

The Senators elected a President/Speaker (Richard Caswell, Sr.), Clerk (John Haywood), Assistant Clerk (Sherwood Haywood), Doorkeeper, and Assistant Doorkeeper. The following Senators were elected by the voters of North Carolina to represent each county:

Legislation
This assembly approved an act to require county courts to conduct a census of white and black residents.  Other acts concerned the following:

 public taxes 
 taxes on imports 
 sale of confiscated property
 regulation of superior courts, 
 real estate 
 sales of slaves 
 appointment of county commissioners 
 building public roads, ferries, and bridges
 providing for the safe keeping of the estates of idiots and lunatics
 repealing the act from the previous assembling concerning sale of western lands to the U.S. Congress, 
 accurate accounting of war service for pensioners 
 fraudulent claims for western lands
 prohibiting loyalists from holding public office and establishing an oath for those taking public office 
 prohibiting paid public servants from holding office in the assembly
 establishing a court for dealing with foreign mercantile transactions and transient persons and maritime affairs
 prevention of horse stealing
 regulating county court of pleas and quarter sessions
 amending the act of the April 1784 assembly dealing with when the assembly would meet
 changing the start date of the assembly from the first Monday in October to the first Monday in November  
 creation of the District of Morgan, which would include Burke, Lincoln, Rutherford and Wilkes Counties 
 creation of the District of Washington, which would include Washington, Sullivan, Greene, and Davidson Counties
 encouraging learning in Salisbury District, which dealt with the former Liberty Hall academy, which was renamed Salisbury Academy in Rowan County
 levying a tax in Salisbury and Hillsborough Districts to repair district buildings
 building a gaol in Wilmington
 establishing principal streets in Fayetteville
 inspecting tobacco in Hillsborough
 disposition of the estate of Simon Cleary
 establishing a town in Jones County
 establishing the town of Morgan 
 creating a local tax in Warren and Franklin counties for building public buildings
 changing taxes in New Bern District
 empowering Wayne County to establish a tax to pay for public buildings
 empowering Bladen County commissioners to purchase land for public buildings
 changing the location of public buildings in Mecklenburg County from Charlotte to a more central location
 clearing and opening the Tar River and Fishing Creek
 empowering commissioners in Northampton County to repair public buildings
 extending the dividing line between Tyrrell and Hyde counties
 several acts dealing with the estates of individuals

For additional details of the legislation of this assembly, see Legislative Documents

Notes

References

1784 October
General Assembly
 1784 October
 1784 October